Interstate 40 (I-40) is part of the Interstate Highway System that spans  from Barstow, California, to Wilmington, North Carolina. In Tennessee, I-40 traverses the state from west to east, from the Mississippi River at the Arkansas border to the northern base of the Great Smoky Mountains at the North Carolina border.

I-40 passes through Tennessee's three largest cities—Memphis, Nashville, and Knoxville—and serves the Great Smoky Mountains National Park, the most visited national park in the United States. It crosses all of Tennessee's physiographical provinces and Grand Divisions—the Mississippi embayment and Gulf Coastal Plain in West Tennessee, the Highland Rim and Nashville Basin in Middle Tennessee, and the Cumberland Plateau, Cumberland Mountains, Ridge-and-Valley Appalachians, and Blue Ridge Mountains in East Tennessee. Landscapes on the route vary from flat, level plains and swamplands in the west, to irregular rolling hills, cavernous limestone bluffs, and deep river gorges in the central part of the state, to plateau tablelands, broad river valleys, narrow mountain passes, and mountain peaks in the east.

I-40 parallels the older U.S. Route 70 (US 70) corridor for its entire length in Tennessee. It has interchanges and concurrencies with four other mainline Interstate Highways in the state and has five auxiliary routes:  I-140, I-240, I-440, I-640, and I-840. Initially constructed in segments, most of I-40 in Tennessee was completed by the latter 1960s. The stretch between Memphis and Nashville, completed in 1966, was the first major Interstate segment to be finished in the state. The last planned section was completed in 1975; much of the route has been widened and reconstructed since then.

The I-40 corridor between Memphis and Nashville is known as "Music Highway" and is culturally significant in that it passes through a region that was instrumental in the development of American popular music. In Memphis, the highway is also nationally significant due to a 1971 US Supreme Court case that established the modern process of judicial review of infrastructural projects. Community opposition to the proposed routing through Overton Park led to a nearly 25-year activist campaign that culminated in this case; this resulted in the state abandoning the alignment through the park in favor of relocating the Interstate onto a section of what was originally part of I-240.

Route description
I-40 runs for  through Tennessee, making it the eighth-longest stretch of Interstate Highway within a single state, and the second-longest east of the Mississippi River. It is the only Interstate Highway to pass through all three of the state's Grand Divisions and all nine physiographic regions. It is maintained by the Tennessee Department of Transportation (TDOT), along with all other Interstate, US, and state highways in Tennessee. The busiest stretch of highway in Tennessee is on the segment concurrent with I-75 in Knoxville between a connector to US 11/70 and Papermill Road, which carried an annual average daily traffic (AADT) volume of 218,583 vehicles in 2022. The lowest traffic volume that year was 26,985 vehicles per day at the North Carolina state line. The busiest weigh station in the country is located on I-40/I-75 in Farragut, a suburb of Knoxville, which serves more than 2.4 million trucks annually.

West Tennessee

Memphis

Immediately within the city of Memphis, Tennessee's second-largest city, the Interstate crosses the southern half of Mud Island before crossing the Wolf River Harbor and Mississippi Alluvial Plain into Downtown Memphis, where the bridge ends next to the Memphis Pyramid. The highway then has an interchange with US 51 (Danny Thomas Boulevard), and, just beyond this point, abruptly turns 90 degrees north at an interchange with the western terminus of I-240, a southern bypass route around the central city, near Midtown. A short distance later is an interchange with SR 14 (Jackson Avenue). Proceeding northward, the freeway crosses the Wolf River and reaches the eastern terminus of SR 300, a controlled-access connector to US 51. Here, the Interstate shifts due east, bypassing the central part of Memphis to the north. Passing near the neighborhoods of Frayser and Raleigh, I-40 intersects with multiple surface streets and crosses the Wolf River for a second time about  later. It then meets SR 14 again and turns southeast, reaching SR 204 (Covington Pike) a short distance beyond.
 
A few miles later, I-40 reaches a complex four-level stack interchange with US 64/70/79 (Summer Avenue) and the eastern terminuses of I-240 and Sam Cooper Boulevard, where a pair of flyover ramps transfer the Interstate's path to the northeast. The highway then crosses the Wolf River for a third and final time. Entering a long straightaway, the Interstate passes through the suburban neighborhoods of East Memphis and Cordova, as well as the incorporated suburb of Bartlett in eastern Shelby County, over the next several miles. This stretch carries eight lanes, with the left lanes serving as high-occupancy vehicle (HOV) lanes during rush hour, and provides several interchanges with local thoroughfares. Afterward, the freeway reaches an interchange with US 64, where it narrows to four lanes. After passing through Lakeland, the Interstate reaches a cloverleaf interchange with the eastern termini of I-269 and SR 385 some distance later near the suburb of Arlington.

Gulf coastal plain

Leaving the Memphis area, I-40 enters rural Fayette County directly east of Arlington and, about  later, crosses the Loosahatchie River and adjacent wetlands. Over the next , the Interstate crosses a flat and level expanse of farmland and some rural woodlands and swamplands in a straight alignment, bypassing most cities and communities. At exit 35 is an interchange with SR 59, which provides access to Covington and Somerville. Several miles later, the highway enters Haywood County near the site of Ford Motor Company's future Blue Oval City manufacturing facility and, some distance beyond this point, turns north and enters Hatchie National Wildlife Refuge. Over the next , the Interstate crosses the Hatchie River and multiple streams and swamps in a long straightaway. Upon exiting the refuge, I-40 turns east and passes southeast of Brownsville, where it has interchanges with SR 76, SR 19, and US 70 over a distance of several miles. The highway then enters Madison County.

Traversing through a mix of additional level farmland and swamplands, I-40 enters Jackson some distance later and crosses the South Fork of the Forked Deer River. Passing through the northern half of Jackson, the Interstate widens to six lanes and has a total of six exits. First, at exit 79, is US 412, which also connects to Alamo and Dyersburg. Immediately beyond is an interchange with the US 45 Bypass (US 45 Byp.). A short distance later is an interchange with US 45 (North Highland Avenue), which also provides access to Humboldt and Milan. Advancing into a residential area, the Interstate interchanges with two surface streets before reaching US 70, which also connects to Huntingdon. I-40 then reduces back to four lanes and leaves Jackson.

From here, the Interstate continues east-northeast through a sparsely populated territory of farmland and woodlands characterized by low rolling hills and, after several miles, enters Henderson County and crosses the Middle Fork of the Forked Deer River a few miles beyond. Some distance later, near the town of Parkers Crossroads, I-40 has an interchange with SR 22, a major north–south corridor in West Tennessee, providing access to Lexington and Huntington. A few miles beyond, the Interstate crosses the Big Sandy River before proceeding through the northern half of Natchez Trace State Park. Over the next several miles, the highway transitions multiple times between Henderson and Carroll counties, before entering Decatur County around milepost 120. After a few miles, the highway reaches US 641/SR 69, another major north–south corridor, which at this point connects to Camden and Decaturville. The Interstate then enters Benton County. Entering Tennessee National Wildlife Refuge at the bottom of this grade, I-40 crosses the Kentucky Lake impoundment of the Tennessee River on the  Jimmy Mann Evans Memorial Bridge into Middle Tennessee.

Middle Tennessee

Western Highland Rim

Upon crossing the Tennessee River into Humphreys County, I-40 exits the refuge a short distance later and traverses through vast woodlands in the rugged hills of the Western Highland Rim for a considerable distance. This section is characterized by several noticeable upgrades and downgrades, with the route roughly following a natural crooked stream valley. About  beyond the river, the highway crosses the Buffalo River. A short distance later is an interchange with SR 13, which connects to Linden and Waverly. After a short distance, the Interstate descends another steep grade, once again utilizing a westbound truck climbing lane, and crosses into Hickman County. A short distance later it reaches SR 50, which connects to Centerville. The highway then crosses the Duck River, traveling through additional wooded areas characterized by further rugged terrain and gradually ascending. It then enters Dickson County and reaches SR 48, which provides access to Centerville and Dickson. I-40 then crosses the Piney River shortly thereafter.

Several miles beyond this point is an interchange with SR 46, the primary exit for Dickson, which also provides access to Centerville and Columbia. After leaving Dickson, I-40 has an interchange with the western terminus of I-840, the outer southern beltway around Nashville. The highway continues through woodlands and rugged terrain and, crossing into Williamson County, ascends steeply over a short distance, gaining an eastbound truck climbing lane. Along this ascent is an interchange with SR 96, which connects to the Nashville suburbs of Fairview and Franklin. Approaching the urban parts of the Nashville metropolitan area, the Interstate enters Cheatham County a few miles later and gradually descends into the Nashville Basin.

Nashville

Around milepost 191, I-40 enters Davidson County, and a few miles later crosses the Harpeth River for a third time. The interstate then widens to six lanes near Bellevue. Entering the urban outskirts of the state capital of Nashville, the highway has an interchange with US 70S near a bend in the Cumberland River. The highway then has an exit with SR 251 (Old Hickory Boulevard) and, a few miles later, once again intersects with US 70 (Charlotte Avenue). I-40 then widens to eight lanes, and, after a short distance, has a four-level interchange with SR 155 (Briley Parkway, White Bridge Road), which includes the western terminus of a northern controlled-access beltway around Nashville. A short distance later, south of Tennessee State University, is the western terminus of I-440, the southern loop around central Nashville, where the Interstate reduces to six lanes.

I-40 passes through the Jefferson Street neighborhood over the next , before entering downtown Nashville near Fisk University. Here, the highway begins a brief concurrency with I-65, turning southeast. As part of the freeway that encircles downtown Nashville known locally as the Downtown Loop or Inner Loop, the two concurrent Interstates have interchanges with US 70 (Charlotte Avenue), US 70S/431 (Broadway), Church Street, and Demonbreun Street. Next, the concurrent routes shift east-northeast near Music Row and the neighborhoods of The Gulch and SoBro, and I-65 splits off, heading south toward Huntsville, Alabama. The concurrent routes then turn southeast, expanding back to eight lanes. I-24 then splits off to the southeast, signed for Chattanooga, and I-40 shifts eastward. The eastern terminus of I-440 and a connector road to US 41/70S (Murfreesboro Road) are also directly accessible from the westbound lanes of I-40 at this interchange.

Entering the Donelson neighborhood, I-40 has an interchange with SR 155 (Briley Parkway) near Nashville International Airport. Beginning here, the left lanes function as HOV lanes during rush hour. A short distance later, the eastbound lanes have a partial exit to an airport connector road; only the westbound lanes of I-40 are accessible from this interchange. Immediately beyond is an exit to SR 255 (Donelson Pike), another important means of access to the airport. Shifting northeast, the Interstate intersects with Stewarts Ferry Pike a few miles later and then crosses the Stones River near J. Percy Priest Dam. Entering the southern fringes of the Hermitage neighborhood, the highway has an interchange with SR 45 (Old Hickory Boulevard) a short distance later and once again shifts eastward into a straightaway. A few miles later, I-40 enters Wilson County and, after a short distance, has an interchange with SR 171 in the Nashville suburb of Mount Juliet. Entering another long straightaway, some distance later the Interstate intersects with SR 109, which provides access to Gallatin to the north. About few miles afterward, the highway has a trumpet interchange with the eastern terminus of I-840 a short distance east of Lebanon. It then enters Lebanon, reduces back to four lanes, and has interchanges with US 231 and US 70.

Eastern Nashville Basin, Eastern Highland Rim, and Cumberland Plateau
Some distance east of Lebanon, it enters Smith County and begins a steep ascent over a few miles where the eastbound lanes gain a truck climbing lane. Some distance beyond this point is an interchange with SR 53 in Gordonsville and near Carthage. Between mileposts 263 and 266, the highway crosses the meandering Caney Fork River five times before crossing into Putnam County. Shortly thereafter, I-40 has an interchange once again with SR 96 in Buffalo Valley, where it shifts southeast and begins its ascent out of the Nashville Basin onto the eastern Highland Rim. Upon reaching the top of the rim, the highway curves northeast and has an interchange with SR 56 southbound and the eastern terminus of SR 141, the former of which connects to Smithville and McMinnville.

Beginning a concurrency with SR 56 at this point, I-40 gradually shifts eastward over the next several miles, before reaching Baxter, where SR 56 splits off and heads north toward Gainesboro. Reaching Cookeville after a short distance, the Interstate has a total of five interchanges, including one with SR 111, a major north–south connector to Chattanooga, and another with US 70N. The Interstate then continues through a wooded area before reaching Monterey a few miles later and turning southeast. Here, I-40 has two interchanges with US 70N, the first of which carries a concurrency with SR 84.

East Tennessee

Cumberland Plateau and Tennessee Valley

After ascending further up onto the Cumberland Plateau, I-40 remains moderately flat and straight as it continues east through a mix of wooded areas and farmland. At mile marker 308, the highway crosses the Tennessee Valley Divide, where the Cumberland and Tennessee river watersheds meet. About  later, the Interstate reaches Crossville, where it crosses the Obed River. Here, the Interstate has three interchanges, including one with US 127, which also connects to Jamestown. East of Crossville, the Crab Orchard Mountains, the southern fringe of the Cumberland Mountains, come into view as the road descends several hundred feet, with the westbound lanes utilizing a truck climbing lane over part of this elevation change.

A short distance beyond this point, I-40 has an interchange with a connector road to US 70 near the town of Crab Orchard. Then, the Interstate enters Crab Orchard Gap, winding through a narrow pass at the base of the Cumberland Mountains once prone to rockslides. This section is characterized by several relatively sharp curves. Beyond this point, the highway ascends upwards over a short distance, with the eastbound lanes utilizing a truck climbing lane. A short distance later, I-40 crosses into Roane County, also transitioning from Central to Eastern time zone at this point. Shortly thereafter, the Interstate curves to the northeast and begins its descent off of the Cumberland Plateau into the Ridge-and-Valley Appalachians, also known as the Tennessee Valley or Great Valley of East Tennessee. I-40 then shifts eastward between Harriman and Rockwood and has an interchange with US 27.

Beyond this point, I-40 crosses a series of paralleling ridges and valleys characteristic of the region's topography. A few miles later is an interchange with SR 29, and, immediately afterward, the highway crosses the Clinch River on the Sam Rayburn Memorial Bridge, with the Kingston Fossil Plant and its  twin smokestacks dominating the view to the north. Next is an interchange with SR 58 southbound in Kingston, where the Interstate begins a brief concurrency with this route. After ascending a short and relatively steep ridge out of the Clinch River Valley, SR 58 splits off to the north, heading toward Oak Ridge. Continuing through the rugged terrain of the Great Appalachian Valley and traversing additional ridges, the Interstate enters Loudon County some distance later and has an interchange with US 321/SR 95 near Lenoir City, before reaching I-75 a short distance beyond.

Knoxville

The two routes turn east-northeast, carrying six through lanes, and cross into Knox County a short distance later. After gradually ascending a steep ridge, the two Interstates shift onto a long straight alignment and pass through Farragut, a suburb of Knoxville. Here, they have an interchange with a local thoroughfare. Upon reaching SR 131 (Lovell Road), the road widens to eight lanes and a short distance later has an interchange with the Pellissippi Parkway (SR 162 northbound, I-140 eastbound), which connects to Oak Ridge and Maryville, respectively. Proceeding through West Knoxville, the two routes have interchanges with additional local roads, before reaching a connector to US 11/70 (Kingston Pike) near the West Hills neighborhood. A short distance later is an interchange with SR 332 (Northshore Drive), and the separate Papermill Road and Weisgarber Road.  later, the routes reach the western terminus of I-640, a beltway which bypasses downtown to the north. Here, I-75 splits off from I-40 onto a brief concurrency with I-640, heading toward Lexington, Kentucky. The Interstate then enters downtown, containing a minimum of six through lanes, as well as several short segments of auxiliary lanes between exits.

Passing near the main campus of the University of Tennessee, as well as several residential neighborhoods, the Interstate first reaches an interchange with the northern terminus of US 129 (Alcoa Highway), a controlled-access artery that provides access to McGhee Tyson Airport and the Great Smoky Mountains National Park. Next is an exit with SR 62 (Western Avenue), and, immediately beyond this point is a three-level interchange with the southern terminus of I-275. Here, the eastbound lanes also have access to US 441 southbound (Henley Street). The highway then crosses a long viaduct over a railyard, before reaching an interchange with SR 158 (James White Parkway) westbound, a controlled-access spur that provides direct access to Downtown Knoxville to the south. I-40 then curves due north and then northeast again before coming to an interchange with a connector to US 441. It enters a predominantly residential area, passing by Zoo Knoxville, and reaches an interchange with US 11W (Rutledge Pike) a few miles later. Just beyond this point, the Interstate reaches the eastern terminus of I-640, shifting eastward. Also at this interchange, it begins a brief unsigned concurrency with US 25W and SR 9, which promptly split off at an interchange with US 11E/70 (Asheville Highway). Leaving Knoxville, the Interstate crosses the Holston River a short distance later.

Smoky Mountains and Pigeon River gorge

Continuing east as a six-lane highway, I-40 travels through the semi-rural Strawberry Plains community before crossing into Sevier County several miles later. A short distance beyond this point, near the Kodak community, the Interstate has an interchange with SR 66 and the northern terminus of the Great Smoky Mountains Parkway, beginning an unsigned concurrency with the former. This interchange is the primary means of access to the Great Smoky Mountains National Park, as well as the tourist attractions in the cities of Sevierville, Pigeon Forge, and Gatlinburg, and, as a result, is one of the busiest non-Interstate exits in the state. SR 66 also splits off at this interchange, but there is no signage for this. A short distance beyond is an interchange with SR 92 in Dandridge. I-40 then reaches an interchange after a few miles with the southern terminus of I-81, which runs into northeast Tennessee to the "Tri-Cities" of Bristol, Kingsport, and Johnson City. Here, the Interstate reduces back to four lanes and turns 90 degrees southeast.

Beginning a moderate descent, I-40 crosses the Douglas Lake impoundment of the French Broad River a few miles later and enters Cocke County some distance later after a small elevation gain. Next, the Interstate has an interchange US 25W/70 near the northern terminus of US 411 outside of  Newport. Traveling along the northern base of English Mountain for a few miles, the Interstate turns southward and has an interchange with US 321. A few miles after leaving Newport, the road has an interchange with SR 73 near Cosby, and veers almost directly south, revealing a dramatic view of  Mount Cammerer at the northeastern end of the Great Smoky Mountains. A few miles later the highway crosses the Pigeon River and has an interchange with the eastern terminus of the Foothills Parkway, before crossing the Pigeon River again about  later and curving sharply to the east. At this point, I-40 enters the Cherokee National Forest and proceeds into the Pigeon River gorge between the Great Smoky Mountains to the south and the Bald Mountains to the north, closely following the north bank of the river. This stretch is also prone to rockslides, and contains mesh nets along some of the cliff slopes as preventive measures. A short distance later, the route curves to the south again near the unincorporated community of Hartford. After a few miles, the highway crosses the Appalachian Trail and enters North Carolina immediately afterward.

Music Highway

The name Music Highway refers to the section of I-40 between Memphis and Nashville, which was designated as such by the Tennessee General Assembly in 1997. The designation commemorates the significant roles that Memphis, Nashville, and the areas in between played in the development of American popular music. Memphis is known as "the Home of the Blues and the Birthplace of Rock and Roll", and Nashville is known as "Music City" for its influence on numerous types of music, especially country. Several cities and towns between the two, including Jackson, Brownsville, Nutbush, Waverly, and others were birthplaces or homes of numerous singers and songwriters. Signs that display the words "Music Highway" along with musical notes are erected in both directions along I-40 throughout this section. In addition, the rest areas along this stretch are each named for musicians or bands associated with the respective locations and contain related information.

History

Predecessor highways
Prior to the settlement of Tennessee by European Americans, a series of Native-American trails existed within what is now the I-40 corridor. The Cumberland Trace, also known as Tollunteeskee's Trail, was a Cherokee trail that passed through the central part of the Cumberland Plateau and was first used by settlers and explorers in the 1760s. In 1787, the North Carolina General Assembly, which, at the time, controlled what is now Tennessee, authorized the construction of a trail between the south end of Clinch Mountain near present-day Knoxville and the Cumberland Association, which included modern-day Nashville. Completed the following year, this trail became known as Avery's Trace and roughly followed several existing Native-American trails. After the creation of the Southwest Territory, the territorial legislature authorized a wagon trail to be constructed between Knoxville and Nashville on July 10, 1795. This trail was officially named the Cumberland Turnpike and became popularly known as the Walton Road after one of its surveyors, William Walton, a veteran of the American Revolutionary War. It was constructed out of portions of Tollunteeskee's Trail, Avery's Trace, and the Emery Road, and passed through the cities of Kingston, Carthage, and Gallatin. It was built from 1799 and 1801 at a cost of $1,000 (equivalent to $ in ).

In 1911, a series of Tennessee businesspeople formed the Memphis to Bristol Highway Association in an effort to encourage the state to improve the network of roads that ran between Memphis and Bristol. After the formation of the Tennessee Department of Highways, the predecessor agency to TDOT, in 1915, the agency designated these roads as the Memphis to Bristol Highway and SR 1. When the US Numbered Highway System was formed by Congress in 1926, the portion of this route connecting Memphis and Knoxville became part of US 70 and US 70S, and the part from Knoxville to Bristol was designated as part of US 11 and US 11W. This highway became recognized as part of the "Broadway of America" highway linking California and New York in the late 1920s.

Planning

The first highway segment included in the I-40 designation in Tennessee was a  freeway in Knoxville, which was jointly constructed by the state and local governments and was also the first freeway in Tennessee. Known initially as the Magnolia Avenue Expressway and later renamed the Frank Regas Expressway, this freeway originated from a 1945 plan that recommended a number of expressways be constructed in Knoxville to relieve congestion on surface streets. Planners intended these freeways to be integrated into the then-proposed nationwide highway network that became the Interstate Highway System, which, at that time, was expected to eventually be authorized by Congress. The location and design of this freeway was finalized in a subsequent plan in 1948, and preliminary construction began on October 1, 1951. The first segment, between Unaka Street and Tulip Avenue, was completed on November 14, 1952, and the second segment, joining Tulip Avenue to Gay Street, was completed on December 10, 1955. The Magnolia Avenue Expressway contained a cloverleaf interchange which was reused for the intersection with I-75 (now I-275) and US 441. This configuration quickly developed a reputation for severe congestion and a high accident rate and became known locally as "Malfunction Junction".

The general location of the freeway that became I-40 was included in a plan for what became the Interstate Highway System, produced by the Public Roads Administration of the now-defunct Federal Works Agency and released on August 2, 1947. The Tennessee leg of I-40 was part of the original  of Interstate Highways authorized for the state by the Federal-Aid Highway Act of 1956, commonly known as the Interstate Highway Act. The numbering was approved by the American Association of State Highway and Transportation Officials (AASHTO) on August 14, 1957. The first design contract for I-40 in Tennessee was awarded on March 4, 1956, for a short section in Davidson County. Within a year, design contracts had been awarded for sections in Davidson, Knox, Roane, Haywood, Madison, Jefferson, and Cocke counties. By 1958, design work was underway for most of the entire route in Tennessee.

Earlier construction

The first contract for construction of I-40 in Tennessee under the Interstate Highway System was awarded on August 2, 1957, for a  section in Roane County between the Clinch River near Kingston and SR 58, and construction began the following month. Construction on I-40 between Memphis and Nashville began on September 18, 1958, in Madison County near Jackson. On October 19, 1961, the bridge over the Clinch River, constructed at a cost of $2.4 million (equivalent to $ in ), was dedicated and opened to traffic by then-Governor Buford Ellington. The  section linking US 70 east of Brownsville and US 70 in Jackson, referred to at the time as the "Jackson Bypass", was opened to traffic on December 1, 1961. The following day, the  segment between the Clinch River bridge in Kingston and Papermill Road in Knoxville opened. On October 31, 1962, the section connecting SR 113 near Dandridge and US 25W/70 in Newport was opened. The first section of I-40 in Middle Tennessee to be completed was the  stretch from SR 96 in Williamson County and US 70S in Bellevue, opened on November 1, 1962. The next day, the  segment joining SR 56 near Silver Point and US 70N in Cookeville saw its first traffic. The short segment from US 70S in Bellevue and US 70 in western Nashville was opened on November 15, 1962.

The short segment between I-240/Sam Cooper Boulevard and US 64/70/79 (Summer Avenue), which was then part of I-240, was dedicated on October 9, 1963, by then-Governor Frank G. Clement and opened to traffic 14 days later. Governor Clement opened and dedicated the  stretch linking SR 59 near Braden and US 70 east of Brownsville on December 17, 1963. Four days later, two sections, the  segment connecting SR 46 in Dickson and SR 96 in Williamson County and the  segment from SR 53 in Gordonsville and SR 56 near Silver Point, were opened. The opening of the short stretch linking Papermill Road to Liberty Street in Knoxville was announced on September 4, 1964. Two short noncontiguous sections, located between US 27 in Harriman and the Clinch River Bridge in Kingston and from Liberty Street to Unaka Street in Downtown Knoxville, respectively, were opened on December 4, 1964. Two separate stretches,  linking I-240 in Memphis and SR 59 in Braden and  connecting US 70 in Jackson and SR 22 in Parkers Crossroads, were dedicated by Governor Clement 10 days later. The short stretch connecting Fesslers and Spence lanes in Nashville, including the eastern interchange with I-24, was declared complete on January 11, 1965. The adjacent short stretch to the west, between the western interchange with I-24 and Fesslers Lane, was partially opened in late December 1963, along with the nearby Silliman Evans Bridge, and fully opened on April 19, 1965.

Work began on the bridge over the Tennessee River on November 29, 1962, and was completed on July 21, 1965, at a cost of $4.62 million (equivalent to $ in ). Multiple short segments of the western portion of the  stretch connecting Spence Lane in Nashville and US 70 in Lebanon were opened to local traffic throughout 1963; dedication of this entire stretch by Governor Clement occurred on August 26, 1965. The  segment from SR 13 in Humphreys County and SR 230 in Hickman County was completed on November 24, 1965. On December 20, 1965, four segments were declared complete by the state highway department. These were the  stretch connecting US 70 in Lebanon to SR 53 in Gordonsville, the  segment from the Tennessee River to SR 13 in Humphreys County, the  stretch linking US 70N in Cookeville and US 70N in Monterey, and the  segment from US 25W/70 to US 321 in Newport. On July 24, 1966, I-40 was completed between Memphis and Nashville, with the opening of the  segment from SR 22 in Parkers Crossroads to SR 46 near Dickson after seven months of weather-related delays. A large dedication ceremony was held on the Tennessee River Bridge, officiated by Governor Clement and US Senator Albert Gore Sr.. This was the first Interstate Highway segment completed between two major cities in Tennessee and cost $109.87 million (equivalent to $ in ).

Later construction
In December 1966, the segment joining US 25W/70 to SR 113 in Jefferson County, including the interchange with I-81, was completed. On April 11, 1967, the short segment from Gay Street to US 11W in Knoxville was opened. The  segment linking US 70N in Monterey and US 127 in Crossville was opened to traffic on December 1, 1967. The final section of I-40 in Knoxville to be completed was the short segment connecting US 11W and US 11E/25W/70, which opened on December 19, 1967, to eastbound traffic, and to westbound traffic on June 21, 1968. The  segment from US 127 in Crossville to US 70 in Crab Orchard was opened on September 12, 1968. The adjacent section extending to SR 299 near the eastern escarpment of the Cumberland Plateau followed on September 26, 1969. The section through the Pigeon River Gorge in Cocke County, as well as into North Carolina, was initially believed by some engineers to be impossible to build. Construction of this segment was one of the most difficult and laborious highway projects in the nation, requiring thousands of tons of earth and rock to be moved. It was also one of the most expensive highway construction projects per mile, at a cost of $19 million (equivalent to $ in ). Work began on this project in 1961, and the entire stretch,  between US 321/SR 32 in Newport and US 276 in Haywood County, North Carolina, was jointly opened to traffic on October 24, 1968, by both states in a dedication ceremony.

The short segment linking 46th Avenue with I-65 in Nashville opened to traffic on March 15, 1971. On July 14, 1971, the short stretch in Memphis from US 51 to  Chelsea Avenue, including the Midtown interchange with I-240 (then I-255), opened. This completed the entirety of I-40 from Memphis to SR 299 near Rockwood, as well as the last stretch in Middle Tennessee. The last segment of the original planned route of I-40 in West Tennessee to be completed was the Hernando de Soto Bridge in Memphis; construction began on May 2, 1967, and the bridge opened to traffic on August 2, 1973. The bridge, which cost $57 million (equivalent to $ in ), was dedicated in a ceremony by Tennessee Governor Winfield Dunn and Arkansas Governor Dale Bumpers on August 17, 1973.

The  segment from SR 299 to US 27 near Harriman and Rockwood, including the descent down Walden Ridge, was opened to traffic on August 19, 1974, after years of delays due to geological problems, completing the entirety of I-40 between Memphis and Knoxville. Work started on this section in early 1966 and was originally expected to be complete by late 1968. The final segment of the planned route of I-40 in Tennessee,  connecting US 11E/25W/70 east of Knoxville to US 25W/70 in Dandridge, was dedicated by Governor Dunn and partially opened to traffic on December 20, 1974, and fully opened on September 12, 1975. Initially planned to carry four lanes, engineers chose to expand this segment to six lanes in 1972 after construction had already begun, based on studies projecting higher-than-average traffic volumes. As a result, this segment was one of the first rural six-lane highways in the country and was also dedicated on the same day that the last sections of I-75 and I-81 in Tennessee were opened. The last section of what is now I-40 in Tennessee to be completed was the section linking Chelsea Avenue and US 64/70/79, which was originally part of I-240. Construction began in April 1974, and the section was opened to traffic by Governor Lamar Alexander on March 28, 1980, after years of delays.

Controversies

In Memphis, I-40 was originally slated to pass through the city's Overton Park, a  public park. This location was announced in 1955 and subsequently approved by the Bureau of Public Roads, the predecessor to the Federal Highway Administration (FHWA), in November 1956. The park consists of a wooded refuge, as well as the Memphis Zoo, Memphis Brooks Museum of Art, Memphis College of Art, a nine-hole golf course, an amphitheater that was the site of Elvis Presley's first paid concert in 1954, and other features. When the state announced the routing through the park, a group of local citizens, spearheaded by a group of elderly women dubbed the "little old ladies in Tennis shoes" by multiple media outlets, began a campaign to stop this construction. The organizers first collected over 10,000 signatures in their support and founded the organization Citizens to Preserve Overton Park in 1957. The movement was also backed by environmentalists, who feared that the Interstate's construction would upset the park's fragile ecological balance, as the wooded area had become an important stopover for migratory birds.

The organization continued to wage their campaign and filed a lawsuit in the US District Court for the Western District of Tennessee in December 1969 after then-US Secretary of Transportation John A. Volpe had authorized the state to advertise bids the previous month. The suit was dismissed on February 26, 1970, by judge Bailey Brown, which was subsequently upheld by the Sixth Circuit Court of Appeals on September 29, 1970. The case was then appealed to the US Supreme Court, which, on March 2, 1971, reversed the lower court rulings in the landmark decision of Citizens to Preserve Overton Park v. Volpe. The court found that Volpe had violated clauses of the Department of Transportation Act of 1966 and Federal-Aid Highway Act of 1968 which prohibit the approval of federal funding for highway projects with feasible alternative routes. For many years after this decision, the state continued to explore options to route I-40 through Overton Park, including tunneling under the park or constructing the highway below grade, but ultimately concluded that these alternatives were too expensive. On January 9, 1981, then-Governor Alexander submitted a request to then-Secretary of Transportation Neil Goldschmidt to cancel the route through Overton Park, which was approved seven days later.

About  of a controlled-access highway was actually built within the I-240 loop east of the park; this portion of highway was named Sam Cooper Boulevard in December 1986, and terminates at East Parkway in the Binghampton neighborhood near the park. In addition, right-of-way was acquired west of the park, and many structures demolished to make way for the Interstate. Most of these empty lots have since been built over. At the time of the route's cancelation, approximately $280 million (equivalent to $ in ) had been budgeted by the federal government for its construction; these funds were then diverted for other transportation improvements in the Memphis metropolitan area.

In western Nashville, I-40 passes through the Jefferson Street community, a predominantly Black American neighborhood, which contains three historically Black colleges and was a site of the Nashville sit-ins during the civil rights movement. Planners considered placing this section near Vanderbilt University but had ultimately settled on the current alignment by the mid-1950s. Before construction began, many residents had come to believe that the interstate would lead to economic decline of their neighborhood and divide it from the rest of the city. Some also believed that the routing was an act of racial discrimination and criticized the state for not being transparent about their plans. In October 1967, several residents of Jefferson Street formed the I-40 Steering Committee and filed a lawsuit against the state in the US District Court for the Middle District of Tennessee hoping to force them to reroute I-40. On November 2, judge Frank Gray Jr. ruled against them, arguing that there was no feasible alternate route. He did, however, concede that the methods the state used to notify residents about the project were unsatisfactory and that the route would have an adverse effect on their community. The organization appealed the decision to the Sixth Circuit, which unanimously upheld the lower court's decision on December 18, and to the Supreme Court, which refused to hear the case on January 29, 1968. The construction of I-40 through Jefferson Street ultimately resulted in many Black residents being displaced to the Bordeaux area in North Nashville and did lead to the deterioration of the neighborhood that had been predicted.

Major projects and expansions

Memphis

The first HOV lanes in the Memphis area opened on September 15, 1997, on the  section between I-240 and US 64 in Bartlett with the completion of a project that widened this segment from four to eight lanes.

The cancelation of the section of I-40 through Overton Park rendered both interchanges with I-240 inadequate to handle the unplanned traffic patterns, thus necessitating their reconstruction. In addition, both interchanges contained ramps with hazardously sharp curves with some of the highest crash rates in the state. On the eastern interchange, reconstruction was accomplished in two separate projects. The first project, which began in January 2001 and was completed in October 2003, constructed a new two-lane flyover ramp from I-40 westbound to I-240 westbound, replacing a single-lane loop ramp, and widened the approach of I-240 south of the interchange. Also in this project, I-40 directly north of the interchange was reconstructed in preparation for the second project and the interchanges with US 64/70/79 (Summer Avenue) and White Station Road were modified.

The second project was initially slated to begin in January 2004 but was delayed until October 2013 due to funding and redesign complications. A two-lane flyover was constructed to carry I-40 eastbound traffic through the interchange, replacing a one-lane ramp. The single-lane ramp carrying I-40 westbound traffic through the interchange was rerouted to become the exit ramp for Summer Avenue and replaced with a two-lane flyover that connects to the flyover constructed in the first project. Additional aspects of this project widened the ramp connecting I-240 eastbound and I-40 eastbound to three lanes, widened both approaches to the interchange on I-40, which required a new 14-lane bridge over the Wolf River, widened the approach on I-240 south of the interchange, added through lanes to Sam Cooper Boulevard, and reconfigured the SR 204 (Covington Pike) interchange. The project cost $109.3 million (equivalent to $ in ), which was, at the time, the highest-bid contract in state history and was completed on December 15, 2016.

The interchange with the western terminus of I-240 near Midtown Memphis was reconstructed between June 2003 and December 2006. This project converted the interchange into a directional T configuration, which required the demolition of several unused ramps and bridges that had been constructed with the intent of I-40 continuing directly east of this interchange prior to the Overton Park controversy. As part of this project, the nearby cloverleaf interchange with SR 14 (Jackson Avenue) was reduced to a partial cloverleaf interchange, and several additional auxiliary lanes and slip ramps were constructed. The northern merge with I-40 and I-240 was moved north of the SR 14 interchange.

Nashville area

In November 1977, TDOT installed a system to detect tailgating vehicles in the westbound lanes of the concurrent segment with I-24, which consisted of sensors embedded in the roadway connected to overhead warning signs with flashing lights and horns. The system was the first of its kind in the country but experienced technical problems and was criticized as ineffective, leading to its decommission in July 1980.

The short segment of I-40 from east of the split with I-24/I-440 and east of SR 255 (Donelson Pike) in eastern Nashville was widened to six lanes from August 1986 and December 1987. From October 1987 to November 1989, the  segment from east of SR 255 to east of SR 45 was widened to six lanes. West of downtown Nashville, the  section between SR 155 (Briley Parkway/White Bridge Road) and US 70 (Charlotte Pike) was expanded to six lanes from February 1988 and December 1989.

The first HOV lanes on I-40 in Tennessee were opened to traffic on November 14, 1996, with the completion of a project that widened the  section between west of SR 45 (Old Hickory Boulevard) in eastern Nashville and east of SR 171 in Mount Juliet from four to eight lanes. These were the second set of HOV lanes constructed in Tennessee. This project, which began in early 1995, was also the first in Tennessee to be constructed with split Jersey barriers in the median every few miles to allow police enforcement from the left shoulders. The short stretch between SR 155 (Briley Parkway/White Bridge Road) and the western terminus of I-440 was modified in a project from November 2002 to July 2005 that widened the stretch to eight through lanes, added auxiliary lanes, improved and expanded access between multiple local thoroughfares, and added partial access control between the southern end of Briley Parkway by means of two new flyover ramps. The second phase, which ran from July 2009 to August 2011, constructed an additional flyover ramp between I-40 and Briley Parkway, converting the interchange to full access control, further modified the White Bridge Road interchange, and widened a short stretch of I-40 west of this interchange.

A project which ran between January 2004 and January 2007 widened the  section connecting I-24/440 to SR 255 from six to eight through lanes, added extra auxiliary lanes between interchanges, and reconstructed the interchange with SR 155 (Briley Parkway) into a fully controlled-access interchange. Work to widen  of I-40 from four to eight lanes between east of SR 171 and east of SR 109 in Lebanon began in July 2012 and was completed in July 2014. The  stretch from east of SR 109 and east of I-840 in Lebanon was widened from four to eight lanes between April 2019 and September 2021.

Knoxville

Beginning in early May 1980, the segment of I-40 in Knoxville between Papermill Road and Gay Street was modified in a project that eliminated the interchanges with 17th Street, Western Avenue, and Gay Street, widened the segment to a minimum of six through lanes, added frontage roads, and reconstructed the gridlock-prone cloverleaf interchange with I-75, known as "Malfunction Junction", into a stack interchange with flyover ramps. The noncontiguous segment between US 11W (Rutledge Pike) and US 11E/25W/70 (Asheville Highway) was also widened to six lanes. The project was completed on March 30, 1982, in a ceremony officiated by Governor Alexander. While these projects were underway, the concurrent part of I-75 on this segment was rerouted around the western leg of I-640, which was completed in December 1980, and the short segment of I-75 north of this segment became I-275. These projects were conducted as part of a larger $250 million (equivalent to $ in ) multi-phase improvement project on multiple roads in the area that was accelerated in preparation for the 1982 World's Fair.

By the mid-1970s, the concurrent segment of I-40 with I-75 between Lenoir City and western Knoxville had begun to experience regular congestion, and, in 1978, the FHWA authorized TDOT to widen the segment from the I-75 interchange near Lenoir City to the Pellissippi Parkway to six lanes and the segment from the Pellissippi Parkway to I-640 to eight lanes, as well as reconstruct interchanges along this segment. TDOT announced plans to proceed with the project in May 1981; however, they initially chose to only widen the entire segment to six lanes, due to the need for immediate congestion relief and the fact that the larger project required additional right-of-way. The six-lane project began in July 1984 with the segment between Papermill Road and the Pellissippi Parkway, and this was completed in December 1985. The remainder of the project, located between the Pellissippi Parkway and the I-75 split, took place from June 1985 to July 1986.

On October 9, 1986, the FHWA approved an environmental impact statement (EIS) for the remainder of the I-40/I-75 improvement project. The first phase, which took place between August 1990 and August 1994, widened the section from east of the Pellissippi Parkway and east of Cedar Bluff Road and reconstructed the interchange with the latter. In preparation for the second phase, Gallaher View Road was extended north to the Interstate between April 1994 and July 1996, with a new overpass over the Interstate and onramp constructed. The second phase, which ran from May 1996 to December 1999, widened the section from east of Cedar Bluff Road to east of Gallaher View Road and extended Bridgewater Road to the Interstate. The interchange with Walker Springs Road was replaced with a new interchange providing access to all three roads via collector–distributor frontage roads in between. The third phase, which occurred between early 2000 and late 2002, widened the segment linking Papermill Road to I-640 from 6 to 10 lanes. The fourth phase, which ran from September 2000 to July 2003, improved the interchange with SR 131 and widened the section from this route to the Pellissippi Parkway. The final phase, which occurred between January 2003 and December 2006, widened the section connecting Gallaher View Road to Papermill Road, and reconfigured the interchanges with the US 11/70 connector and Papermill Road. A new collector–distributor facility serving the westbound ramps was built along the Papermill interchange, and ramps providing direct access to Weisgarber Road and SR 332 were constructed.

On February 28, 2002, the FHWA approved an EIS for a project called "SmartFix 40" between I-275 and Cherry Street. The first phase, which ran from July 6, 2005, to September 21, 2007, consisted of reconstructing and realigning the interchanges with SR 158 (James White Parkway), Hall of Fame Drive, and Cherry Street, and constructing collector–distributor ramps between these interchanges. For the second phase, I-40 between SR 158 and Hall of Fame Drive was completely closed to all traffic between May 1, 2008, and June 12, 2009. This substandard section, which was four lanes from east of I-275 to SR 158 and six lanes between SR 158 and Cherry Street, was widened to six lanes, plus additional auxiliary lanes. It had been a severe bottleneck and was highly accident-prone. In addition, left-hand entrance and exit ramps with the SR 158 interchange were eliminated. During this closure, through traffic was required to use I-640 or surface streets, and inbound and outbound ramps connecting I-40 and I-640 at both interchanges were temporarily widened to three lanes to facilitate the extra volume. Both phases of SmartFix 40 won an America's Transportation Award from AASHTO in 2008 and 2010, respectively. At a cost of $203.7 million (equivalent to $ in ), SmartFix 40 was at the time the largest project ever coordinated by TDOT, and one of only two of its kind attempted in the US.

Other projects

Between July 1997 and November 1999, the  section from US 25W/70 to I-81 in Jefferson County was widened to six lanes.

A 2008 study conducted by TDOT on the I-40 and I-81 corridors identified a number of steep grades difficult for trucks to ascend, causing congestion and safety hazards. This resulted in TDOT constructing truck climbing lanes throughout the corridor. In 2018, a  westbound truck lane immediately west of the Tennessee River in Benton County and a  westbound truck lane in Humphreys and Hickman counties were completed. The following year, two additional projects, a  lane in Dickson and Williamson counties and a  lane in western Smith County, both in the eastbound direction, were completed. In 2020, the most recent truck lane was completed on a  segment of the eastbound lanes in eastern Cumberland County.

In Jackson, TDOT is working to widen I-40 to six lanes and improve interchanges in three separate phases. The entire first phase was completed in early July 2021. It was completed on November 7, 2022. The final phase, which began on July 10, 2022, and is expected to be completed by May 31, 2024, widens the  segment from west of US 412 to west of US 45 Byp.

Geological difficulties

The rugged terrain of East Tennessee presented numerous challenges for I-40 construction crews and engineers. Rockslides, especially along the eastern Cumberland Plateau and in the Pigeon River Gorge, have been a persistent problem both during and since the road's construction.

Crab Orchard and Walden Ridge area

On December 17, 1986, a truck driver was killed when his truck struck a boulder that had fallen across the road just east of Crab Orchard.

While still under construction, 20 rockslides occurred along the Walden Ridge section, miles 341–346, of the eastern plateau in 1968 alone. This prompted various remedial measures throughout the 1970s, including the employment of rock buttresses, gabion walls, and horizontal drains. A minor rockslide shut down the right lane of westbound I-40 at mile 343 on May 6, 2013.

Pigeon River gorge

An area very prone to rockslides is the Pigeon River gorge, especially in the vicinity of the Tennessee–North Carolina state line. Throughout the 1970s, this stretch of I-40 was repeatedly shut down by rockslides, sometimes for several weeks at a time. Nevertheless, rockslides in 1985 and 1997 again forced the closure of I-40 in the Pigeon River gorge for several weeks. Additional stabilization measures were implemented, including the blasting of loose rock, the installation of rock bolts, and the construction of a better drainage system. In spite of these measures, another massive rockslide occurred in the Pigeon River gorge on October 26, 2009, blocking all lanes just across the border at North Carolina mile 3. The section was closed to traffic in both directions until April 25, 2010. On January 31, 2012, the westbound lanes of I-40 were closed because of a rockslide near the North Carolina border. Traffic was detoured along I-26 and I-81 and reopened a few months later.

Sinkholes
Sinkholes are a consistent issue along highways in East Tennessee. One particularly problematic stretch is a section of I-40 between miles 365 and 367 in Loudon County, which is underlain by cavernous rock strata. In the 1970s and 1980s, TDOT employed numerous stabilization measures in this area, including backfilling existing sinkholes with limestone, collapsing potential sinkholes, and paving roadside ditches to prevent surface water from seeping into the volatile soil.

Other incidents and closures

On December 23, 1988, a tanker truck hauling liquified propane overturned along a one-lane ramp carrying I-40 traffic through the Midtown interchange with I-240 in Memphis, rupturing a small hole in the front of the tank. The leaking gas ignited in a boiling liquid expanding vapor explosion (BLEVE), producing a massive fireball that set nearby vehicles and structures on fire and instantly killed five motorists, including the driver. This killed one occupant and started additional fires which subsequently spread to multiple other buildings. A total of seven additional cars were destroyed, and 10 cars, six houses, and one additional residential complex were damaged. 10 people were injured, and two people who were inside of homes impacted by the fires later died from their injuries. A truck driver was also killed when he crashed into a traffic jam caused by the accident. This accident was one of the deadliest and most destructive motor vehicle accidents to ever occur in Tennessee and provided momentum for the eventual reconstruction of the interchange.

On May 11, 2021, inspectors discovered a crack on a tie girder of the Hernando de Soto Bridge, resulting in closure of the bridge to all traffic. A subsequent investigation revealed that the crack had existed since at least May 2019, and reports later surfaced that the crack had likely existed since August 2016. TDOT awarded an emergency repair contract for the bridge on May 17, 2021, that was conducted in two phases. In the first phase, which was completed on May 25, 2021, fabricated steel plates were attached to both sides of the fractured beam. The second phase consisted of the installation of additional steel plating and removal of part of the damaged beam. The eastbound lanes of the bridge reopened on July 31, 2021, and the westbound lanes reopened two days later.

Exit list

See also

Notes

References

External links

Tennessee Music Highway – official website

 Tennessee
40
Transportation in Shelby County, Tennessee
Transportation in Fayette County, Tennessee
Transportation in Haywood County, Tennessee
Transportation in Madison County, Tennessee
Transportation in Henderson County, Tennessee
Transportation in Carroll County, Tennessee
Transportation in Decatur County, Tennessee
Transportation in Benton County, Tennessee
Transportation in Humphreys County, Tennessee
Transportation in Hickman County, Tennessee
Transportation in Dickson County, Tennessee
Transportation in Williamson County, Tennessee
Transportation in Cheatham County, Tennessee
Transportation in Davidson County, Tennessee
Transportation in Wilson County, Tennessee
Transportation in Smith County, Tennessee
Transportation in Putnam County, Tennessee
Transportation in Cumberland County, Tennessee
Transportation in Roane County, Tennessee
Transportation in Loudon County, Tennessee
Transportation in Knox County, Tennessee
Transportation in Sevier County, Tennessee
Transportation in Jefferson County, Tennessee
Transportation in Cocke County, Tennessee